Gina Maria Adenauer (born 16 August 1985 in Hamm, North Rhine-Westphalia) is a race car driver from Germany.

Career
She started her career in karting, then moved to German Formula König at the age of 17 in 2002, moving on to German Formula VW the following year and on to German Formula Three in 2004, where she drove for the Seyffarth team. In 2005, she was racing in the Toyota Yaris Cup for "Busch-Racing". In 2006, she took part in the F3 Euroseries race at the Norisring, finishing 5th in the Drivers' Trophy which is restricted to drivers who are not more than 22 years old, using chassis specifications that are 2 to 4 years old. She also raced in the SEAT León Supercopa series, finishing 12th in her debut in the Konrad Motorsport entered car.

References

External links
Website

1985 births
Living people
Sportspeople from Hamm
Racing drivers from North Rhine-Westphalia
German racing drivers
German Formula Three Championship drivers
German female racing drivers
Formula 3 Euro Series drivers
Japanese Formula 3 Championship drivers